Gaoyou Subdistrict  is a subdistrict in Gaoyou, Yangzhou, Jiangsu.  , it has 15 residential communities and 4 villages under its administration.

Transport
 Gaoyou railway station

References

Gaoyou
Township-level divisions of Jiangsu